Get On with It is a live Chumbawamba album released in 2006. It features recordings made at Chumbawamba shows throughout England in 2006, covering songs from all throughout their musical career.

The songs "Timebomb", "Homophobia" and "Stitch That/A Stitch in Time" were also on their 1994 live album Showbusiness!.

Vocal group Coope, Boyes & Simpson are featured. Their songs were previously sampled by Chumbawamba on the album Readymades and they contributed vocals to the previous album A Singsong and a Scrap. They are also label mates on No Masters Records.

Track listing
All songs are written and arranged by Chumbawamba, except where noted.

Personnel
Boff Whalley
Jude Abbott
Lou Watts
Neil Ferguson
with
Phil 'Crikey!' Moody – Accordion
Richard 'Why Not?' Ormrod – Accordion
Coope, Boyes & Simpson – vocals on 13

External links

Get On with It at YouTube (streamed copy where licensed)

Chumbawamba albums
2006 live albums
No Masters live albums